K: Missing Kings is a 2014 Japanese animated film based on the K anime series. The movie takes place one year after the anime in the summer. The movie was released on July 12, 2014.

Plot
On October 13, about a year after the events of the “Academy Island Incident” between four of the seven Kings, Silver Clansmen Kuroh Yatogami and Neko have been searching for their master, Yashiro Isana. Without finding any clues to his whereabouts, the two became disheartened. However, one day, they see HOMRA members Rikio Kamamoto and Anna Kushina being chased by someone.

Cast

Production
On May 26, 2013, it was announced that there will be a sequel to the anime series in the form of a film. The film had a worldwide premiere on July 5, 2014 at Anime Expo in Los Angeles, Japan Expo in Paris, and also select cinemas in Malaysia, Singapore and Taiwan. In Japan, it premiered on July 12, 2014. In the US and Malaysia, it premiered on July 18, 2014 in selected theaters. It was released on Blu-ray and DVD on April 22, 2015. The English cast was revealed by Viz Media on October 7, 2016, and gained its North American release on March 14, 2017.

Reception
The film has not received many reviews in English. Ernest Hardy wrote in The Village Voice, "The film looks great; the animation is detailed, fluid in action and meticulously mapped out. But K Missing Kings is really for diehards who have not only embraced the series but also the handful of manga it spawned.", while Martin Tsai in the Los Angeles Times called it a "hot mess".

K: Missing Kings grossed $826,323 at the box office.

References

External links

Japanese animated films
2014 anime films
Animated films based on animated series
GoHands
Viz Media anime